Lemyra bimaculata is a moth of the family Erebidae. It was described by Frederic Moore in 1879. It is found in eastern India (in the Himalayas from Garhwal to Darjeeling) and Nepal.

References

bimaculata
Moths described in 1879